Tetyana Grygorivna Hlushchenko (born July 12, 1956 in Kiev) is a former Soviet/Ukrainian handball player who competed in the 1976 Summer Olympics.

She trained at Spartak in Kiev. In 1976 she won the gold medal with the Soviet team. She played all five matches.

References

External links
profile

1956 births
Living people
Russian female handball players
Soviet female handball players
Ukrainian female handball players
Handball players at the 1980 Summer Olympics
Olympic handball players of the Soviet Union
Olympic gold medalists for the Soviet Union
Spartak athletes
Olympic medalists in handball
Medalists at the 1976 Summer Olympics
Sportspeople from Kyiv